A diving platform or diving tower is a type of structure used for competitive diving. It consists of a vertical rigid "tower" with one or more horizontal platforms extending out over a deep pool of water. In platform diving, the diver jumps from a high stationary surface. The height of the platforms – ,  and  – gives the diver enough time to perform the acrobatic movements of a particular dive. Most platforms are covered by some sort of matting or non-slip surface to prevent athletes from slipping.  

All three levels of the platform are used in the NCAA competition.  Each level offers a distinct degree of difficulty (DD) and therefore can yield different scores for divers.

Ten-meter diving 
Diving began in the Olympics in 1904 for men, in what was called "fancy diving", which has been believed variously to have been off a platform or off a springboard.  The 10-meter dive began in the 1908 Olympics.  Diving for women started in the 1912 Olympics, with the 10-meter dive.

In 2016, dives performed by competitors in 10-meter world competition included a 3-½ somersault tuck, a 3-½ somersault pike, a 2-½ somersault with 2½ twist, a forward 4-½ somersault, and a forward reverse 3½ somersault.

See also
 Springboard
 List of 10-meter diving platforms

References

External link

Platform